Amazons is an American made-for-television  thriller film, first aired on ABC on January 29, 1984. The film was directed by Paul Michael Glaser and starred Madeleine Stowe.

Plot
Dr. Sharon Fields is framed for malpractice following the death of a patient, an influential congressman, and uncovers the existence of a secret cult of "Amazons" who assassinate powerful men.

Cast
 Madeleine Stowe as Dr. Sharon Fields
 Jennifer Warren as Dr. Diane Cosgrove
 Tamara Dobson as Rosalund Joseph
 Jack Scalia as Lt. Tony Monaco
 Stella Stevens as Kathryn Lundquist
 William Schallert as Congressman Stanford Barstow
 Nicholas Pryor as Dr. Thompson
 Peter Scolari as Dr. Jerry Menzies
 Leslie Bevis as Vivian Todd
 Jordan Charney as Congressman Harris Stowe
 Greg Monaghan as James
 Stephen Shellen as Kevin
 Hansford Rowe as Gov. Price

References

External links

1984 films
1984 television films
ABC network original films
Films scored by Basil Poledouris
Films directed by Paul Michael Glaser
American thriller television films
1980s American films